The 2010 Nippon Professional Baseball (NPB) Draft was held on October 28, for the 46th time at the Grand Prince Hotel Takanawa to assign amateur baseball players to the NPB. It was arranged with the special cooperation of Toshiba with official naming rights. The draft was officially called "The Professional Baseball Draft Meeting supported by TOSHIBA ".It has been sponsored by Toshiba for the 2rd consecutive year since 2009.

Summary 
Only the first round picks will be done by bid lottery. After the second round, waver selections were made in order from the lowest-ranked team of the 2011 season in both the Central League and Pacific League, the third round was reversed and selections were made from the top team, and the fourth round was reversed again, alternating with selections from the lowest-ranked team until all teams had finished selecting players.

Since the  season, the winner of the NPB All-Star Game has determined whether the Central League or the Pacific League gets waiver preference after the second round. In the 2010 All-Star Game, the Central League and Pacific League had a 1-1-1 tie, but regulations gave the Central League waiver priority over the Pacific League. 

Attention was focused on candidates such as Tatsuya Oishi, Yuki Saito, Hirokazu Sawamura, and other college-age right-handed pitchers. Under the circumstances, the Yomiuri Giants publicly announced that they would pick Sawamura in the first round, and Sawamura also expressed his refusal to negotiate if he was picked by a team other than the Giants. As a result, other teams backed away from Sawamura, and the Giants picked him alone. The Giants' approach was criticized.

First Round Contested Picks 

 Bolded teams indicate who won the right to negotiate contract following a lottery.
 In the first round, Hirokazu Sawamura (Pitcher) was selected by the Giants, and Yudai Ohno (Pitcher)  by the Dragons without a bid lottery.
 In the second round, Kota Suda (Pitcher) was selected by the Baystars, Yuya Fukui (Pitcher) by the Carp, Daiki Enokida (Pitcher) by the Tigers, and Ayatsugu Yamashita (Catcher) by the Hawks without a bid lottery.
 In the fourth round, the last remaining Buffaloes  selected Shunta Gotoh (Outfielder).
 List of selected players.

Selected Players 

The order of the teams is the order of second round waiver priority.
 Bolded After that, a developmental player who contracted as a registered player under control.
 List of selected players.

Yokohama  Baystars

Tohoku Rakuten Golden Eagles

Hiroshima Toyo Carp

Orix Buffaloes

Tokyo Yakult Swallows

Hokkaido Nippon-Ham Fighters

Yomiuri Giants

Chiba Lotte Marines

Hanshin Tigers

Saitama Seibu Lions

Chunichi Dragons

Fukuoka SoftBank Hawks

References

External links 
 2010 プロ野球ドラフト会議 supported by TOSHIBA - NPB.jp Nippon Professional Baseball 

Nippon Professional Baseball draft
Draft
Nippon Professional Baseball draft
Nippon Professional Baseball draft
Baseball in Japan
Sport in Tokyo
Events in Tokyo